Haliscera racovitzae is a species of deep sea hydrozoan of the family Halicreatidae.

References

Halicreatidae
Animals described in 1906